Agnieszka is the Polish equivalent of the female given name Agnes. 

Notable people with this name include: 

Agnieszka Arnold, Polish documentary filmmaker
Agnieszka Baranowska (1819–1890), Polish playwright and poet
Agnieszka Bednarek (born 1986), international Polish volleyball player
Agnieszka Brustman (born 1962), female Polish chess master
Agnieszka Brzezańska (born 1972), artist based in Warsaw
Agnieszka Brugger (born 1985), German politician
Agnieszka Chylińska (born 1976), Polish rock singer and columnist
Agnieszka Domańska (born 1970), Polish ice dancer
Agnieszka Dowbor-Muśnicka (1919–1940), Polish WWII resistance fighter
Agnieszka Duczmal (born 1946), Polish conductor
Agnieszka Dulej (born 1983), Polish ice dancer
Agnieszka Dygant (born 1973), Polish actress
Agnieszka Graff (born 1970), Polish writer, translator, publicist, feminist and activist
Agnieszka Holland (born 1948), Polish film and TV director and screenwriter
Agnieszka Karpiesiuk (born 1982), Polish track and field sprinter
Agnieszka Kołakowska (born 1960), Polish philosopher, philologist, translator and essayist
Agnieszka Kotlarska (1970–1996), the first Polish winner of the Miss International beauty pageant
Agnieszka Niedźwiedź (born 1995), Polish mixed martial artist
Agnieszka Osiecka (1936–1997), Polish poet, lyricist, and journalist
Agnieszka Pachałko, the second Polish winner of the Miss International pageant
Agnieszka Perepeczko (born 1942), actress now living in Australia
Agnieszka Pilchowa (born 1888), one of the most famous Polish clairvoyants
Agnieszka Pogroszewska (born 1977), Polish hammer thrower
Agnieszka Radwańska (born 1989), WTA Tour top 10 Polish tennis player
Agnieszka Siwek (born 1962), Polish track and field sprinter
Agnieszka Truskolaska (1755–1831), Polish actress, opera singer and theatre director
Agnieszka Włodarczyk (born 1980), Polish actress and singer
Agnieszka Warchulska (born 1972), Polish actress
Agnieszka Wieszczek (born 1983), Polish female freestyle wrestler
Agnieszka Wojtowicz-Vosloo, filmmaker and writer

Polish feminine given names